is a private women's university in Moriyama-ku, Nagoya, Aichi Prefecture, Japan. The predecessor of the school was founded in 1889. It was chartered as a university 1949.

Kinjo Gakuin University has 14 undergraduate departments and majors covering a wide range of fields — from human/social science to natural science — and a graduate school in the humanities and in human ecology offering master's and doctoral degrees.

Milestones
 1889 Kinjo Girls' School (a private school) established
 1927 Kinjo Girls' Vocational School established
 1947 Under educational system reform, Kinjo Gakuen Junior High School established
 1948 School renamed
 1949 Kinjo Gakuin University (College of English Literature) established
 1954 College of English Literature reorganized to Faculty of Literature
 1962 College of Home Economics (present-day Human Life and Environment) established
 1967 Graduate School of Humanities established
 1996 Graduate School of Human Ecology established
 1997 College of Contemporary Society and Culture established
 2002 College of Human Sciences established
 2005 College of Pharmacy established

See also
 Junior College, Kinjo Gakuin University
 Ōmori-Kinjōgakuin-mae Station

External links
  

Educational institutions established in 1889
Private universities and colleges in Japan
Universities and colleges in Nagoya
Women's universities and colleges in Japan
1889 establishments in Japan
Christian universities and colleges in Japan